Plectroglyphidodon johnstonianus, commonly known as the Johnstone Island damselfish, is a species of damselfish from the Indo-Pacific. It occasionally makes its way into the aquarium trade. It grows to a size of 14 cm in length.

References

 Randall, John E. – Reef and Shore Fishes of the Hawaiian Islands.

External links
 

johnstonianus
Fish described in 1924